Leipzig was the lead ship of her class of light cruisers built by the German navy. She had one sister ship, Nürnberg. Leipzig was laid down in April 1928, was launched in October 1929, and was commissioned into the Reichsmarine in October 1931.

Leipzig participated in non-intervention patrols during the Spanish Civil War. In the first year of World War II, she performed escort duties for warships in the Baltic and North seas. While on one of these operations in December 1939, the ship was torpedoed by a British submarine and badly damaged. Repairs were completed by late 1940, when she returned to service as a training ship. She provided gunfire support to the advancing Wehrmacht troops as they invaded the Soviet Union in 1941.

In October 1944, Leipzig collided with the heavy cruiser Prinz Eugen; the damage was so severe that the navy decided complete repairs were unfeasible. The ship was patched up to keep her afloat, and she helped to defend Gotenhafen from the advancing Red Army in March 1945. She then carried a group of fleeing German civilians, reaching Denmark by late April. After the end of the war, Leipzig was used as a barracks ship for minesweeping forces and was scuttled in July 1946.

Design

She displaced  at full load. Leipzig had a crew of 26 officers and 508 enlisted men.

Her propulsion system consisted of two steam turbines and four 7-cylinder MAN two-stroke double-acting diesel engines, which were the basis for the unsuccessful US Navy Hooven-Owens-Rentschler design. Steam for the turbines was provided by six Marine-type, double-ended, oil-fired water-tube boilers.

The ship was armed with a main battery of nine  SK C/25 guns mounted in three triple gun turrets. One was located forward, and two were placed in a superfiring pair aft, all on the centerline. They were supplied with between 1,080 and 1,500 rounds of ammunition, for between 120 and 166 shells per gun. As built, the ship was also equipped with two  SK L/45 anti-aircraft guns in single mounts; they had 400 rounds of ammunition each. Leipzig also carried four triple torpedo tube mounts located amidships; they were supplied with twenty-four  torpedoes. She was also capable of carrying 120 naval mines.

Service history

Leipzig was laid down at the Reichsmarinewerft shipyard in Wilhelmshaven on 28 April 1928 and launched on 18 October 1929. She was commissioned into the Reichsmarine on 8 October 1931. The ship trained extensively in the Baltic Sea throughout 1932 and 1933, and also made several goodwill cruises overseas. In 1934, she and the cruiser Königsberg made the first goodwill visit to the United Kingdom since the end of World War I. In late 1934, Leipzig went into drydock for modifications. An aircraft catapult was installed on the aft superstructure and a crane for handling float planes replaced one of her boat derricks. The original single-mount 8.8 cm anti-aircraft guns were replaced with twin mounts. These modifications were made in Kiel. In early 1935, Leipzig joined the old pre-dreadnought battleship , the new heavy cruiser Deutschland, and the light cruiser Köln for major fleet exercises.

Later in 1935, Adolf Hitler visited the ship during training maneuvers with the rest of the fleet. The ship joined her sister Nürnberg and Köln for exercises in the Atlantic Ocean in early 1936. In August, Leipzig took part in the non-intervention patrols off Spain during the Spanish Civil War. She conducted several patrols between August 1936 and June 1937, and in late June, she was allegedly attacked with torpedoes; this prompted Germany and Italy to withdraw from the non-intervention patrols. She thereafter returned to Germany and  went into the Baltic Sea for training, which lasted through 1938. In March 1939, she participated in the annexation of Memel which Germany had demanded from Lithuania. The following month, she joined the battleship Gneisenau, the cruiser Deutschland, and several destroyers and U-boats for major exercises in the Atlantic. Additional maneuvers were conducted through the middle of 1939.

World War II

1939–1940

At the outbreak of World War II in September 1939, Leipzig was assigned to the blocking force that was intended to prevent the escape of the Polish Navy from the Baltic; they were unsuccessful. Leipzig thereafter went to the North Sea, where she and the other light cruisers laid a series of defensive minefields. This task lasted through the end of the month, after which she returned to the Baltic for training maneuvers. On 17–19 November, Leipzig covered a minelaying operation in the North Sea. She joined Deutschland, Köln, and three torpedo boats for a sweep in the Skagerrak for Allied shipping on 21–22 November. Leipzig was tasked with escorting the battleships Scharnhorst and Gneisenau through the Skagerrak, and with covering their return on the 27th.

On 13 December, Leipzig was tasked with escorting a flotilla of destroyers and other small vessels as they proceeded through the Skagerrak to lay a minefield. While en route, the British submarine  attacked the German warships, and at 11:25, hit Leipzig with a torpedo. The torpedo hit Leipzig just below the waterline, where a bulkhead separated two of the ship's three boiler rooms. The two boiler rooms were flooded, steam lines were damaged, and the port turbine was shut down. At around the same time, her sister Nürnberg was also torpedoed. A pair of destroyers arrived to escort the damaged cruisers back to port; an hour after Leipzig was torpedoed, one of the escorting destroyers was also torpedoed, just outside the mouth of the Elbe. Another torpedo passed just ahead of Leipzig, nearly hitting the damaged cruiser.

While en route back to Germany on 14 December, Nürnberg and Leipzig came under attack from the British Royal Air Force (RAF). Approximately 20 Vickers Wellington bombers from No. 99 Squadron were intercepted by fighters from II. Gruppe (2nd group) of Jagdgeschwader 77 (JG 77—77th Fighter Wing) under the leadership of Oberstleutnant Carl-Alfred Schumacher in the vicinity of Spiekeroog and Wangerooge. The RAF bombers failed to further damage the cruisers as JG 77 pilots claimed seven and one probable bomber shot down, including one claimed by Unteroffizier Herbert Kutscha. RAF records indicate that six bombers were lost in the attack. After safely returning to port in Kiel, Leipzig was taken into the Deutsche Werke shipyard for repairs. She was decommissioned while under repair and reclassified as a training ship. To accommodate additional training crews, four of the ship's boilers were removed. She returned to service in late 1940.

1941–1946
In early June 1941, she escorted the heavy cruiser Lützow (formerly Deutschland) to Norway. After she returned to the Baltic, she and the cruiser Emden provided artillery support to advancing German ground forces during Operation Barbarossa, the invasion of the Soviet Union. In September, she supported the invasion of the Baltic islands in the West Estonian archipelago. While bombarding Soviet positions on Moon Island, Leipzig was attacked unsuccessfully by the Soviet submarine Shch-317. In late September, the ship joined the German Baltic Fleet, centered on the battleship Tirpitz; the fleet was tasked with blocking a possible Soviet attempt to break out of the Baltic. Leipzig returned to Kiel in October, and conducted maneuvers with the heavy cruiser Admiral Scheer. Leipzig became the flagship of the training fleet in 1942; she spent the year performing training duties.

Leipzig was decommissioned briefly in March 1943, and recommissioned on 1 August. She was in need of an overhaul, however, and the work significantly delayed her return to operational status. Furthermore, an outbreak of meningitis killed two crewmen and created an additional delay. Leipzig returned to escort duties in the Baltic in mid-September 1944. Her first operation covered troop transports between Gotenhafen and Swinemünde in company with Admiral Scheer. On 14 October, Leipzig departed Gotenhafen, bound for Swinemünde, to take on a load of mines. At the time of collision, Leipzig was switching from her diesel cruise engines to her steam turbine main engines, a process of first uncoupling the diesels from the shafts and then coupling turbines to the shafts, which left the ship temporarily without propulsion, drifting out of her fairway into the path of Prinz Eugen which was moving the opposite direction. Prinz Eugen struck Leipzig on her port side, just forward of her funnel,  cutting her nearly in half - the forward point of the clipper bow of Prinz Eugen actually stuck out beyond the starboard side of Leipzig. The collision destroyed the number 3 (port) engine room, flooded a second engine room and killed or wounded 39 crewmen. The ships remained stuck fast for over a day, after which Leipzig was towed back to Gotenhafen.} The damage was so severe that repairs were deemed impractical, especially considering Germany's pressing military situation by late 1944. Only repairs to keep her afloat in the harbor were effected.

Leipzig provided fire support to the defending German forces in March 1945, while Soviet Red Army forces advanced on the city. On 24 March, Leipzig was moved to Hela, laden with refugees; she was capable of steaming at only . She was repeatedly attacked by Soviet aircraft, and Allied submarines attempted to torpedo her twice. She nevertheless safely reached Denmark on 29 April. Due to her poor state following the end of the war, she was used as a barracks ship for the men of the German Mine Sweeping Administration, tasked with clearing mines off the German coast. The battered ship was eventually towed out and scuttled in July 1946.

Footnotes

References

Further reading
 
 

 

Leipzig-class cruisers
Ships built in Wilhelmshaven
1929 ships
Shipwrecks in the North Sea
World War II cruisers of Germany
Maritime incidents in October 1944
Maritime incidents in 1946
Military units and formations of Nazi Germany in the Spanish Civil War
Scuttled vessels of Germany